William H. Poole (January 2, 1897 – October 1, 1974) served in the California State Assembly for the 52nd district from 1941 to 1943 and during World War I he served in the United States Army.

References

United States Army personnel of World War I
Democratic Party members of the California State Assembly
20th-century American politicians
1897 births
1974 deaths